Robert William Maclagan Wedderburn (1947–1975) was a Scottish statistician who worked at the Rothamsted Experimental Station. He was co-developer, with John Nelder, of the generalized linear model methodology,
and then expanded this subject to develop the idea of quasi-likelihood.

Wedderburn was born in Edinburgh, where he attended Fettes College, then studied for a degree and a diploma in statistics at the University of Cambridge. He died aged 28 of anaphylactic shock from an insect bite while on a canal holiday.

"His colleagues remember him as someone of engaging diffidence, who would nonetheless hold his own in argument when he was sure he was right (as he usually was)," wrote John Nelder in Wedderburn's obituary.

References

Scottish statisticians
1947 births
1975 deaths
Deaths due to insect bites and stings
People educated at Fettes College
Scientists from Edinburgh
20th-century Scottish mathematicians
Deaths from anaphylaxis
Rothamsted Experimental Station people
Alumni of the University of Cambridge
Mathematical statisticians
Biostatisticians